Göncruszka is a village in Borsod-Abaúj-Zemplén county, Hungary.

References

External links 
 Street map 

Populated places in Borsod-Abaúj-Zemplén County